Express 13 is a 1931 German thriller film directed by Alfred Zeisler and starring Charlotte Susa, Heinz Könecke and Fee Malten. It was shot at UFA's Babelsberg Studios in Berlin. The film's sets were designed by Willi Herrmann and Herbert Lippschitz.

Synopsis
Revolutionaries plot to assassinate a president by blowing up the rail tracks in order make his train derail but this is averted just in time. Herbert Schmitt, a passenger on a nearby express train becomes mixed up with the attractive Dorit who wants to use him to help launch a second attempt to kill the president.

Cast
 Charlotte Susa as Dorit
 Heinz Könecke as Herbert Schmitt
 Fee Malten as Ella, seine Frau
 Ludwig Andersen as Der feine Urban
 Alfred Beierle as Caspar
 Viktor Schwanneke as Terry

References

Bibliography

External links 
 

1931 films
1930s thriller films
German thriller films
1931 drama films
Films of the Weimar Republic
German drama films
1930s German-language films
Films directed by Alfred Zeisler
UFA GmbH films
German black-and-white films
Films shot at Babelsberg Studios
1930s German films